Epsilon Phoenicis is a star in the constellation Phoenix. Its apparent magnitude is 3.87. Located around  distant, it is an orange giant of spectral type K0III, a star that has used up its core hydrogen and has expanded.

References

Phoenix (constellation)
K-type giants
Phoenicis, Epsilon
000765
0025
000496
Durchmusterung objects